The Tallahassee Metropolitan Statistical area is the metropolitan area centered on Tallahassee, Florida.

The Tallahassee Metropolitan Statistical Area is a metropolitan statistical area (MSA) designated by the Office of Management and Budget and used by the Census Bureau and other agencies for statistical purposes. The Tallahassee Metropolitan Statistical Area consists of the Florida counties of Gadsden, Jefferson, Leon and Wakulla.

 Tallahassee, in Leon County, is designated as the principal city in the MSA. 
 Monticello, is the county seat of Jefferson County. 
 Crawfordville, is the county seat of Wakulla County. 
 Quincy is the county seat of Gadsden County.

The Thomasville, Georgia Micropolitan Area abuts the Tallahassee Metropolitan Area to the north. The Florida counties of Leon, Gadsden, Wakulla and Jefferson plus the Georgia county of Decatur make up the Tallahassee, FL-Bainbridge, GA Combined Statistical Area.

History
The Tallahassee Standard Metropolitan Statistical Area was first defined after the 1970 United States Census, and at that time included only Leon County. Wakulla County was added to the SMSA after the 1980 census. After the 1990 census, Wakulla County was removed from the MSA and Gadsden County was added. Jefferson County and Wakulla County (for the second time) were added to the MSA after the 2000 Census.

Demographics
As of the census of 2000, there were 320,304 people, 125,533 households, and 75,306 families residing within the MSA. The racial makeup of the MSA was 63.59% White, 32.17% African American, and 1.39% from two or more races. 3.72% were Hispanic or Latino of any race.

The median income for a household in the MSA was $34,728, and the median income for a family was $42,957. Males had a median income of $29,628 versus $24,977 for females. The per capita income for the MSA was $17,552.

In 2008 the population of the MSA was 357,259.

References

Metropolitan and Micropolitan Statistical Area Definitions - retrieved July 17, 2006

 
Geography of Gadsden County, Florida
Geography of Jefferson County, Florida
Geography of Leon County, Florida
Geography of Tallahassee, Florida
Geography of Wakulla County, Florida